Enclosure was the legal process in England of enclosing a number of small landholdings to create one larger farm.

Enclosure or enclosed may also refer to:

Land
 Enclosure, an enclosed area of agricultural land; see Field
 Enclosure (archaeology), an area of land separated from surrounding land by earthworks, walls, or fencing

Structures
 Container, device creating a partially or fully enclosed space
 Enclosure castle, a defended residence or stronghold

Animal confinement
 Pen (enclosure), an enclosure for holding animals
 Cage, an enclosure often made of mesh, bars or wires, used to confine, contain or protect something or someone
 Paddock, a small enclosure for horses
 Pasture, land used for grazing

Engineering
 Housing (engineering), enclosures for components, machinery
 Enclosure (electrical), a cabinet for electrical or electronic equipment
 Computer enclosure or computer case
 Card enclosure, a container for smart cards
 Loudspeaker enclosure, the box containing a loudspeaker system
 Disk enclosure, a specialized chassis designed to hold and power disk drives

Music
 Enclosure (Merzbow album), 1987
 Enclosure (John Frusciante album), 2014
 "Enclosure", a song from the album Metal Gear Solid Original Game Soundtrack
 * Enclosure (jazz), a technique in jazz compositions

Other uses
 RSS enclosure, a pointer to a media file from a web feed
 Enclosure, a document or item accompanying a letter
 The Enclosure, a 1961 novel by Susan Hill
 Enclosure (film), a 1961 film
 Enclosure Historic District, a historic district located in Nutley, Essex County, New Jersey, United States

See also
 Enclosed religious orders, religious orders separated from the external world
 Oppidum, a large fortified Iron Age settlement
 Cloister (from Latin , "enclosure"), a feature running along the walls of buildings forming a quadrangle
 Close (disambiguation)
 Cover (disambiguation)
 Container (disambiguation)
 Receptacle (disambiguation)
 Wrap (disambiguation)